= Managee =

Managee can be:

- In management, a person who is managed (the opposite of a manager).
- In computing theory, a process or application that is managed by another process or application.
